Route 363 is a  south-north route in Quebec, Canada, going from Route 138 in Deschambault-Grondines along the St-Lawrence river to Lac-aux-Sables.

It goes through St-Marc-des-Carrières where it is called Boulevard Bona-Dussault. After St-Marc, it enters a forest and then runs parallel to a railroad track.

It is then concurrent for about 3 km in St-Casimir with Route 354 along the Rivière Ste-Anne, where it is rue (street) Notre-Dame. Once it crosses the river, heading north, it is called Boulevard de la Montagne.

It also goes through St-Ubalde after having climbed the Laurentian Mountains. In the village of St-Ubalde, it has the name of Boulevard Chabot, but out of town, it takes the name of Rang St-Achille.

It ends at the junction of Route 153 in Lac Aux Sables.

There is an overpass at the Autoroute 40, where there is exit 254. This exit is a major truck stop with now 2 restaurants and gas stations on each side of the freeway. There is now a brand new Subway restaurant just built on the south side of the 40, along with a new and modern Esso gas station.

Towns along Route 363
 Deschambault-Grondines
 Saint-Marc-des-Carrieres
 Saint-Casimir
 Saint-Ubalde
 Montauban-les-Mines
 Lac-aux-Sables

Major intersections

See also
 List of Quebec provincial highways

References

External links
 Provincial Route Map (Courtesy of the Quebec Ministry of Transportation) 
 Route 363 on Google Maps

363
Roads in Capitale-Nationale